Barykino is a rural locality (a selo) in Tarbagataysky District, Republic of Buryatia, Russia. The population was 368 as of 2010. There are 5 streets.

Geography 
Barykino is located 36 km southwest of Tarbagatay (the district's administrative centre) by road. Barykino-Klyuchi is the nearest rural locality.

References 

Rural localities in Tarbagataysky District